Little Miss Broadway is a 1947 American musical film starring Jean Porter and directed by Arthur Dreifuss. Dreifuss also co wrote the screenplay.

Plot
A girl visits her relatives who she thinks are wealthy, not knowing they are penniless. Judy Gibson and her fiancé, Dick Nichols, are taken in by a number of rogues at a New York mansion they pretend to own, which actually belongs to an imprisoned gangster. They attempt a scam with $200,000 in loot found hidden at the crook's home, but Judy ultimately gets the better of all.

Cast
 Jean Porter as Judy
 John Shelton as Dick
 Douglas Wood as Richard
 Edward Gargan as Uncle George
 Ruth Donnelly as Minnie
 Kirk Alyn as Lt. O'Brien

Production
The film was originally known as Broadway Baby. Columbia bought the rights to the script in November 1946 and assigned it to producer Sam Katzman.

This was the second movie Porter made for Katzman, following Betty Co-Ed. Filming started on 20 January 1947.

References

External links

Little Miss Broadway at IMDb

1947 films
1940s musical comedy-drama films
American musical comedy-drama films
Columbia Pictures films
American black-and-white films
1947 comedy films
1947 drama films
Films directed by Arthur Dreifuss
1940s American films